From the 33rd Congress through the 36th Congress, Kansas Territory elected a non-voting delegate to the United States House of Representatives.

List of members representing the district

Notes

References 

Territory
Former congressional districts of the United States

At-large United States congressional districts